Moussa Sene Absa, Moussa Sène Absa, or Moussa Sène Absa (proper name: Moussa Sène) is a Senegalese film director, editor, producer, screenwriter, painter and songwriter. He was born in 1958 in Tableau Ferraille, a suburb of Dakar, Senegal, to a Serer family.

Film
Moussa Sène began his career as an actor, but eventually moved on to direct his own play La Légende de Ruba, which he also wrote. Moussa was honored for his screenplay Les Enfants de Dieu (The Children of God) at the Francophone film festival in Fort-de-France. His first film Le Prix du mensonge (The Price of Lies) earned him the Tanit d'argent (Silver Tanit) at the Journées cinématographiques de Carthage  (Carthage Film Festival) in 1988 which propelled his career as a film maker.  He went on to win several international awards in 1992 with his feature film Ça Twiste À Poponguine.  His film Tableau Ferraille released in 1996 earn him several awards including Best Cinematography at the FESPACO in 1997. He was also the producer for Senegal Television's comedy series Goorgorlu (2002). Moussa has made at least ten Senegal related documentaries and he is the songwriter or co-songwriter for all of his films as well as the editor, producer, director and screenwriter.

Art
Known for his films, music and documentaries, he is also a prominent artist whose works are exhibited in Senegal, Europe and North America (United States of America in particular) fetching thousands of Dollars. Moussa's art works are vivid and colourful, and have been exhibited since 1976. His style is inspired by the works of  Rufino Tamayo and Joan Miró, with elements of the older African technique. Some of his art works have been exhibited at the Frieda and Roy Furman Gallery at Lincoln Center, New York City.

Selection of work

Filmography
1988: Le Prix du mensonge
1990: Ken Bugul
1991: Entre nos mains ; Jaaraama ; Set Setal
1992: Moolan
1993: Offrande à Mame Njare
1994: Ça twiste à Poponguine ; Yalla yaana
1995: Tableau Ferraille
1998: Jëf Jël ; Tableau ferraille
1999: Blues pour une diva
2001: Ainsi meurent les anges
2002: L'Extraordinaire destin de Madame Brouette (Madame Brouette)
2004: Ngoyaan, le chant de la séduction
2007: Téranga Blues
2010: Yoole
2010: The Lost Wings of Angels (documentary)
2020: Black and White (television series)
2022: Xalé

Art
Telling Oracle
A Lullaby For Massene
Beauty From Tableau Ferraille
Baay Faals In Paradise
Clando
Beggars In The City
The Fiance
Blues In Paradise
Cops Of Another Time

References

External links
 Africa Cultures Biography
 French Television (TV5Monde) : Les cinémas d'Afrique, l'encyclopédie du film africain 
 BBC World Service : Specials: "Who's who at Frespaco" (2003)
 Africa International Film Festival (2010)
 At play mall : The Art Biography - Moussa Sene Absa's art gallery
 "INTERVIEW WITH MOUSSA SENE ABSA, Director of Madame Brouette" by PCC, original source: "La Fête Films, 2002", translated into English by Michael Dembrow

1958 births
Living people
People from Dakar
Senegalese film directors
Serer film directors